The 1963 LPGA Tour was the 14th season since the LPGA Tour officially began in 1950. The season ran from February 1 to November 17. The season consisted of 32 official money events. Mickey Wright won the most tournaments, 13. She also led the money list with earnings of $31,269.

There were two first-time winners in 1963: Mary Mills and Barbara Romack.

The tournament results and award winners are listed below.

Tournament results
The following table shows all the official money events for the 1963 season. "Date" is the ending date of the tournament. The numbers in parentheses after the winners' names are the number of wins they had on the tour up to and including that event. Majors are shown in bold.

Awards

References

External links
LPGA Tour official site
1963 season coverage at golfobserver.com

LPGA Tour seasons
LPGA Tour